Clap Board Production is a Tamil film production and distribution house. Clap Board Production is located in Vadapalani, Chennai. It has produced over two films in Tamil and distributed over three films. V. Sathyamurthy is the director of Clap Board Production.

Filmography

Production

Distribution

References

Film_production_companies_based_in_Chennai
Film_distributors_of_India
Companies with year of establishment missing